Breaffy, officially Breaghwy, is a village in County Mayo, Ireland. It is 3.7km southeast of Castlebar, the county town.

Village 
The Shamrock Bar, a small pub, is located next to St. Aloysius' Roman Catholic Church, which was built in 1978 replacing a 19th-century church. St. John's National School is opposite and is composed of the original school building from 1890, now used as a community centre, and a modern school building that has been developed since the 1990s and has 308 pupils. The four star Breaffy House Hotel is located in a wooded area to the side of the village. The hotel was previously the home to the Browne family, the landlords of the area until the mid-20th century.

The village also features a 19th-century post office and schoolteachers residence, both of which are now disused. Breaffy also has a Gaelic Athletic Association pitch. The Breaffy GAA teams are the Mayo County "A"  minor Champions and County under-21 B Champions.

People
 Thomas Mullen, Fianna Fáil Teachta Dála (TD) for the Dublin County constituency from 1938 to 1943.
 Eugene Mullen, Fianna Fáil TD for the Mayo South constituency from June to September 1927.
 Aidan O'Shea, Gaelic footballer for Breaffy GAA and Mayo GAA.
 Seamus O'Shea, Gaelic footballer for Breaffy GAA and Mayo GAA.
 Rob Hennelly, Gaelic footballer for Breaffy GAA and Mayo GAA.
 Patrick Anthony Ludden, prelate.

See also 
 List of towns and villages in Ireland

References

External links 
 "The Brownes Of Breaffy" by Brian Hoban
 St. John's National School Website (archived)
 Breaffy GAA Club

Castlebar
Towns and villages in County Mayo